Events in the year 1967 in Ireland.

Incumbents
 President: Éamon de Valera
 Taoiseach: Jack Lynch (FF)
 Tánaiste: Frank Aiken (FF)
 Minister for Finance: Charles Haughey (FF)
 Chief Justice: Cearbhall Ó Dálaigh 
 Dáil: 18th
 Seanad: 11th

Events
 9 January – Demonstrations by the National Farmers' Association caused major chaos when farm machinery blocked many roads.
 4 April – The Fianna Fáil party made a presentation to former Taoiseach Seán Lemass.
 18 April – The Minister for Education, Donogh O'Malley, revealed his plan for a single multi-denominational University of Dublin.  This would combine University College Dublin and Trinity College Dublin. The plan was not enacted.
 30 June – Jacqueline Kennedy arrived in Ireland for a holiday with her children, Caroline and John. She was received at the president's residence, Áras an Uachtaráin, where she was an overnight guest, by President Éamon de Valera and his wife, Sinéad. She was received in the evening by Taoiseach Jack Lynch and his wife Máirín at a state banquet at Dublin Castle.
 1 July – Jacqueline Kennedy attended the Irish Sweeps Derby horse race at the Curragh with the Taoiseach and his wife.
 4 August – Senator Margaret Mary Pearse, sister of Patrick Pearse and Willie Pearse, the executed 1916 leaders, was 89 today.  She was greeted by President de Valera.
 4 September – Ireland's free post-primary school transport scheme began. The CIÉ transport company brought 38,000 students to 350 schools.
 10 September – The Minister for Education, Donogh O'Malley, made a surprise announcement of free secondary education for all from 1969.
 4 November – Taoiseach Jack Lynch returned to Dublin following talks on the European Community with President Charles de Gaulle in Paris.
 4 December – The first independent computer in Ireland began operation at Shannon Airport.
 11 December – Taoiseach Jack Lynch and Northern Ireland Prime Minister Terence O'Neill met for talks in Stormont. Lynch's car was snowballed by Ian Paisley and his supporters.
 29 December – The Minister for Labour, Patrick Hillery, announced details of a new redundancy payments scheme which took effect from New Year's Day.
 Unknown - The Galtee Meats company was founded.

Arts and literature

 17 September – British rock band Pink Floyd performed their only concert in Ireland at the Arcadia Ballroom in Cork.
 29 September – The Focus Theatre in Dublin opened its doors for the first time.
 2 December – Poet Patrick Kavanagh was buried in his native Inniskeen, County Monaghan.
 The Censorship of Publications Act provided that prohibition orders made on the grounds of indecency or obscenity would expire after twelve years.
 The New Writers Press was founded by poets Michael Smith and Trevor Joyce with Smith's wife Irene in Dublin to publish poetry.
 Eavan Boland's poems New Territory were published.
 John Montague's poems A Chosen Light were published.
 Flann O'Brien's novel, The Third Policeman (written 1939–40), was published posthumously in London.
 Edward Delaney's bronze statue Wolfe Tone was completed.
 The Project Arts Centre was founded in Dublin.

Sport
 19 November – Jimmy O'Connor scored the world's fastest ever hat-trick in a first-class association football match when he scored three goals in 2 minutes and 13 seconds (some sources dispute this, and claim the actual time was 2 minutes and 14 seconds) for Shelbourne F.C. against Bohemian F.C. in a League of Ireland match at Dalymount Park.

Births
 12 January – Gary Kirby, Limerick hurler.
 22 January – Eleanor McEvoy, singer songwriter.
 6 February – Susan McKeown, folk singer.
 1 March
 Justin Benson, cricketer.
 Ann Gallagher, Labour Party politician.
 14 March – Willie O'Connor, Kilkenny hurler.
 16 March – Terry Phelan, footballer born in England of Irish descent
 17 March – Angus Dunlop, cricketer.
 3 April – Liam Twomey, doctor, Fine Gael party Teachta Dála (TD), Senator.
 20 April – Alan McLoughlin, footballer born in England of Irish descent (died 2021).
 25 April – Alan Kernaghan, footballer born in England of Irish descent.
 6 May –John Fitzgibbon, Cork hurler.
 16 May – Barry Andrews, Fianna Fáil politician, TD for Dún Laoghaire.
 19 May – Geraldine Somerville, actress.
 26 May – Philip Treacy, hat designer.
 July – Anne Marie Forrest, author.
 6 July – Mark Foley, Cork hurler.
 4 September – Cathal Casey, Cork hurler.
 12 September – Kieran McGuckin, Cork hurler.
 15 October
 Lawrence Roche, road racing cyclist.
 Don Wycherley, actor
 13 December – Noel Fitzpatrick, veterinary surgeon.

Full date unknown
 Tina Kellegher, actress
 Brian Smyth, painter.
 Enda Walsh, playwright.

Deaths
 1 January – Séamus Burke, Sinn Féin party TD, a founder-member of the Cumann na nGaedheal party and later Fine Gael party (born 1893).
 28 January – Helena Molony, fought in the 1916 Easter Rising and first woman president of the Irish Trades Union Congress (born 1884).
 10 March – Ina Boyle, composer (born 1889).
 16 March – Thomas MacGreevy, poet and director of the National Gallery of Ireland (born 1893).
 12 April – Sam English, association football player (born 1908).
 22 April – Walter Macken, novelist, dramatist and actor (born 1915).
 4 August – Edmond Pery, 5th Earl of Limerick, peer and soldier (born 1888).
 14 September – Rupert Edward Cecil Lee Guinness, 2nd Earl of Iveagh, businessman, politician and philanthropist, Chancellor University of Dublin (born 1874).
 November – Edward Richards-Orpen, furniture maker and independent member of Seanad Éireann (born 1884).
 30 November – Patrick Kavanagh, poet and novelist (born 1904).
 18 December – James Everett, Labour Party TD, Cabinet minister (born 1894).
 18 December – Florence O'Donoghue, historian and Irish Republican Army intelligence officer (born 1895).
 28 December – John Joe O'Reilly, Cumann na nGaedheal party and Fine Gael party TD (born 1881).

Full date unknown
 Mary Devenport O'Neill, poet and dramatist (born 1879).

See also
 1967 in Irish television

References

 
1960s in Ireland
Ireland
Years of the 20th century in Ireland